Reza Esteki (11 May 1937 – 25 February 2004) was an Iranian weightlifter. He won the bronze medal at the 1966 Asian Games, He also participated at the 1964 Summer Olympics.

References

External links
 

1937 births
2004 deaths
Iranian male weightlifters
Olympic weightlifters of Iran
Weightlifters at the 1964 Summer Olympics
Medalists at the 1966 Asian Games
Asian Games bronze medalists for Iran
Weightlifters at the 1966 Asian Games
Asian Games medalists in weightlifting
Sportspeople from Isfahan
20th-century Iranian people